Michael Ashburner  (born 23 May 1942) is a biologist and Emeritus Professor in the Department of Genetics at University of Cambridge. He is also the former joint-head and co-founder of the European Bioinformatics Institute (EBI) of the European Molecular Biology Laboratory (EMBL) and a Fellow of Churchill College, Cambridge.

Education
Born in Brighton, Sussex, England,  Ashburner attended High Wycombe Royal Grammar School from 1953 to 1960. He studied at Churchill College, Cambridge, and received his Bachelor of Arts in Natural Sciences Tripos (Genetics) in 1964, his PhD from the Department of Genetics in 1968, and was awarded a Doctor of Science in 1978.

Research and career
Most of Ashburner's research has been on the model organism Drosophila melanogaster. Ashburner's career began in the early period of molecular biology prior to the development of most of the recombinant DNA techniques in use today, such as Northern/Southern/Western blotting.  Nevertheless, by observing patterns of "puffing" in polytene chromosomes, he established the existence of a cascade of genetic controls in the post-larval development triggered by ecdysone. The Ashburner model of 1974 became a paradigm for metazoan gene regulation inasmuch as the Jacob-Monod model did for prokaryotes. Ashburner collaborated widely and mentored numerous PhD students and Postdoctoral research students during his career.

Ashburner was also a member of the consortium that eventually sequenced and annotated the Drosophila melanogaster genome.  Ashburner's recollections of the sequencing of the D. melanogaster genome forms the basis of a book entitled "Won for All: How the Drosophila Genome Was Sequenced". A prolonged effort by his laboratory to characterise the Adh region became invaluable for validating annotation strategies when large-scale genome information became available. Ashburner and his colleagues have received funding from the Biotechnology and Biological Sciences Research Council (BBSRC), the Medical Research Council (MRC) and Engineering and Physical Sciences Research Council (EPSRC) for their studies on Drosophila genomics leveraging the D. melanogaster genome and its annotation.

Computational biology
Ashburner was also an early pioneer in the application of computers to biology.  His contributions include his active participation in setting up FlyBase and the development of Open Biomedical Ontologies to allow machine-searchable annotation of biological information, particularly the Gene Ontology and ChEBI. He was instrumental in establishing the EBI, as well as securing its location in the UK, and acted as the first head of the EBI jointly with Graham Cameron.

Open science advocacy
As part of his involvement the sequencing of the D. melanogaster genome, Ashburner played an instrumental role in ensuring that the resulting sequence and annotations would be made publicly available. Additionally, Ashburner made a strong case for the human genome published in Science in 2000 by Celera Genomics to be made freely available, and has spoken out repeatedly against the privatization of genomic resources. Ashburner was also one of the signatories of the first open letter to Science in 2001 calling for a centralized, open repository of the scientific literature, and subsequently became a strong advocate of Open Access publishing, speaking out for this cause in the scientific literature and popular media. He also provided written evidence to the UK Parliament Select Committee on Science and Technology supporting Open Access publishing and served on the initial advisory board of UK PubMed Central, the first global mirror site of the PubMed Central repository of freely available biological literature.

Awards and honours
Ashburner was elected a Foreign Honorary Member of the American Academy of Arts and Sciences in 1993. He received the Gregor Mendel Medal from the Academy of Sciences, Czech Republic in 1998, the first George W. Beadle Award of the Genetics Society of America in 1999, an honorary Doctorate from the University of Crete in 2002, an honorary Doctor of Science from the University of Edinburgh in 2003, the Genetics Society Medal of the UK Genetics Society in 2005 and the Franklin Award of the Bioinformatics Organization in 2006. Ashburner was elected a Fellow of the Royal Society (FRS) in 1990, his certificate of election reads:

References

1942 births
Living people
People from Brighton
Members of the European Molecular Biology Organization
Fellows of the American Academy of Arts and Sciences
Fellows of the International Society for Computational Biology
Fellows of the Royal Society
English geneticists
British bioinformaticians
Alumni of Churchill College, Cambridge
Fellows of Churchill College, Cambridge
People educated at the Royal Grammar School, High Wycombe
English biologists